ABC Television-Africa made history on March 24, 2005, when it was inaugurated by President Alhaji Ahmad Tejan Kabbah, President of the Republic of Sierra Leone and Vice President of Sierra Leone Solomon Berewa, as the first private independent terrestrial broadcaster in Sierra Leone.  It ceased operations within 2 years after failing to be profitable.

History
The station was founded, designed and constructed by Sierra Leonean Allieu M. Shaw. The station broadcasts on UHF. The Western Area including the capital Freetown, Port Loko, Kambia, Lunsar and some areas of Makeni are covered by the broadcast signals, with plans to increase coverage. The station broadcast news and entertainment programs, cultural and education programs, sports and youth programs, health, movies, drama, religion, and live broadcasts. The station employed over thirty personnel.

External links
 ABC-Africa webpage.

Television stations in Sierra Leone
Television channels and stations established in 2004